Raul Rǎzvan Costin, (born 29 January 1985), was a Romanian footballer. His predominant position is central midfielder but he can also play in a more defensive role and also as a right back. He is best known for his simple distribution and long shots.

Early career
Costin is a product of the Naţional București youth academy making his first-team debut during the 2006–07 season against CFR Cluj coming on as a substitute in a 1–0 loss. Before his Naţional debut, he has played one season loaned to FC Sibiu during the 2005–06 season. In the 2008 summer, because of Progresul's (former Naţional) disaffiliation, he signed for Dacia Mioveni where he managed 12 goals, in 32 matches, finishing 6th with his team.

FC Vaslui
On 18 July 2009, he signed a three-year contract with SC Vaslui for an undisclosed fee. He made his first-team debut on 12 August, against Gaz Metan Mediaş coming as a substitute in a 2–1 win and he scored his first goal against Poli Iaşi in the Moldavian Derby, also in a 2–1 win. He helped his team reaching the Romanian Cup final after scoring the first goal, in the 4–0 win against FC Brașov in the semi-finals. On 15 April 2012 he scored an amazing goal against CS Mioveni in a 3–0 victory.

Simurq
In August 2013, Costin signed for Azerbaijan Premier League side Simurq. Costin made his debut for Simurq in their second game of the season, away to Khazar Lankaran on 11 August 2013, coming on as a 63rd-minute substitute for Stjepan Poljak. Costin's first goal for Simurq was the winning goal in the 89th minute against Inter Baku on 1 September 2013.

Universitatea Cluj
After one season at Simurq, Costin moved to Universitatea Cluj in June 2014.

Honours

Rapid București
Liga II: 2015–16

References

External links

1985 births
Living people
People from Ilfov County
Romanian footballers
Association football midfielders
FC Progresul București players
CS Mioveni players
FC Vaslui players
FC Universitatea Cluj players
FC Botoșani players
FC Rapid București players
Simurq PIK players
ASA 2013 Târgu Mureș players
CS Concordia Chiajna players
FC Argeș Pitești players
Liga I players
Liga II players
Azerbaijan Premier League players
Romanian expatriate footballers
Expatriate footballers in Azerbaijan